Dorset Opera Festival is an annual country house opera festival combining amateur and professional performers, which takes place at Bryanston near Blandford Forum in Dorset, England.

Operas are staged at the conclusion of a two-week summer school, focussing on the 18–25 age group, based at Bryanston School. It attracts performers from around Europe. Founded as Dorset Opera by Patrick Shelley at Sherborne School in 1974, it moved to Bryanston in 2005, when Roderick Kennedy became its artistic director, and it became Dorset Opera Festival in 2011. Operas are staged in The Coade Hall theatre at the school, and touring productions are also staged elsewhere.

Recent productions below. For a full list from 1974 to present day visit the Dorset Opera Productions Archive

2011: Puccini's Tosca  and Verdi's Otello 

2012: Verdi's Il trovatore,  Puccini's Suor Angelica, and Le Carrosse du Saint-Sacrament by Lord Berners. 

2013: La traviata, directed by Jonathan Miller, Wagner's The Flying Dutchman and a reduced version of La bohème staged by Dutch National Touring Opera.

2014: Verdi's Aida and Beethoven's only opera, Fidelio

2015: Verdi's Un Ballo in Maschera and Donizetti's L'elisir d'amore

2016: Tchaikovsky's Eugene Onegin and Verdi's Macbeth

2017: Gounod's Faust and Rossini's Le comte Ory

2018: Puccini's La bohème and Massenet's Le Cid (the British stage première)

2019: Donizetti's Lucia di Lammermoor and Verdi's Nabucco

2021: Mozart's Don Giovanni, Mozart's Così fan tutte and Handel's Acis & Galatea in the Mozart orchestration

2022: Puccini's Manon Lescaut and Mozart's The Magic Flute

Forthcoming July 2023: Mozart's Le Nozze di Figaro and Massenet's Le roi de Lahore

See also
List of opera festivals

References

External links
Official site

Opera festivals
Opera in the United Kingdom
Music festivals in Dorset
Music festivals established in 1974
1974 establishments in England
Annual events in England